Tiffany Devonna Cameron (born 16 October 1991) is a Canadian-born Jamaican professional footballer who plays as a forward and at times as a midfielder for the Jamaica women's national team. She previously played for Borussia Mönchengladbach in the German Bundesliga, F.C. Ramat HaSharon in the Israeli top-division Israeli First League and TSG 1899 Hoffenheim in the German Bundesliga as well as Seattle Reign FC and FC Kansas City in the National Women's Soccer League. She has also played for Apolon Limassol in the Cypriot First Division and for the Canada women's national soccer team.

Early life
Born in Toronto, Ontario to Jamaican parents Yvonne Brown and Donovan Cameron, Cameron attended St. Joseph's Secondary School in Mississauga, Ontario, where she played basketball for three years and soccer for one year.

Ohio State University
A NSCAA second team All-American and two-time first team All-Big Ten selection, Cameron left Ohio State as the Buckeyes' all-time leading goal scorer with 40 and earned 96 career points, also the most in the school's history. During her senior year in 2012, she led the Buckeyes with 21 goals, breaking the previous school record of 13. Cameron's nine game-winning goals were the most in the country and her 19 career game-winners tied for fourth-most in Big Ten history.

Playing career

Club

NWSL: Seattle Reign FC and FC Kansas City, 2013
In February 2013, Tiffany Cameron signed with the Seattle Reign FC for the inaugural season of the NWSL.

On 19 June 2013 Seattle Reign FC released Tiffany Cameron and Lyndsey Patterson shortly after signing with Megan Rapinoe, Stephanie Cox and Kennya Cordner due NWSL rules. On June 26, 2013, Cameron signed with FC Kansas City.

TSG 1899 Hoffenheim, 2014
On 2 February 2014, Cameron signed for German team TSG 1899 Hoffenheim .

Ottawa Fury
Later in 2014, she played for Ottawa Fury Women.

Apollon Limassol, 2015
On 9 March 2015, Cameron signed with Apollon Limassol to participate in the UEFA Champions League group stage matches in August. She made three Champions League appearances and scored three goals. Her team needed either a win or tie in their last match in order to move on to the round of 32 and failed to do so.

F.C Ramat HaSharon, 2015–2016
On 1 October 2015, Cameron signed with F.C. Ramat HaSharon in the Israeli top-division Israeli First League. She won the golden boot, scoring 38 goals in 24 matches and helped her team capture their first ever League Championship.

Borussia Mönchengladbach, 2016
On 7 June 2016, Cameron signed with Borussia Mönchengladbach who was promoted to the German Bundesliga for the 2016/2017 season.

International career

Canada 
Cameron earned her first three caps with the Canada women's national soccer team in January 2013 during the Four Nations Tournament in China. She previously represented Canada as a member of the Canada U-17 women's national team. She played in four matches at the FIFA U-17 Women's World Cup, held in Auckland, New Zealand where she started all four matches and helped the team to the quarterfinal round. She also played in the CONCACAF U17 championships in 2008 in Trinidad and Tobago and led the bronze medal-winning Canadian team in scoring. Tiffany also won a bronze medal with Ontario at the 2007 U16 Girls National All-Star Championship, an event where she won the Top Scorer award.

Jamaica 
As the six matches Cameron played for Canada at senior level were all friendlies, she could still change her affiliation to the Jamaica women's national team. Following the historic FIFA Women's World Cup qualification by the Reggae Girlz, she was named to the training camp roster in January 2019. She made her debut in a 1–0 friendly win against Chile on 28 February 2019.

International goals
Scores and results list Jamaica's goal tally first

See also
List of association footballers who have been capped for two senior national teams

References

External links

 
 
 Ohio State player profile
 
 
 
 
 

1991 births
Living people
Citizens of Jamaica through descent
Jamaican women's footballers
Women's association football midfielders
Women's association football forwards
Ohio State Buckeyes women's soccer players
OL Reign players
FC Kansas City players
TSG 1899 Hoffenheim (women) players
Apollon Ladies F.C. players
F.C. Ramat HaSharon players
Borussia Mönchengladbach (women) players
FF USV Jena players
Vittsjö GIK players
National Women's Soccer League players
Frauen-Bundesliga players
Ligat Nashim players
Damallsvenskan players
Toppserien players
Stabæk Fotball Kvinner players
Ferencvárosi TC (women) footballers
Jamaica women's international footballers
2019 FIFA Women's World Cup players
Jamaican expatriate women's footballers
Jamaican expatriate sportspeople in the United States
Expatriate women's soccer players in the United States
Jamaican expatriate sportspeople in Cyprus
Expatriate women's footballers in Cyprus
Jamaican expatriate sportspeople in Israel
Expatriate women's footballers in Israel
Jamaican expatriate sportspeople in Germany
Expatriate women's footballers in Germany
Jamaican expatriate sportspeople in Sweden
Expatriate women's footballers in Sweden
Jamaican expatriate sportspeople in Norway
Expatriate women's footballers in Norway
Soccer players from Toronto
Canadian women's soccer players
Canada women's international soccer players
Dual internationalists (women's football)
Canadian expatriate women's soccer players
Canadian expatriate sportspeople in the United States
Canadian expatriate sportspeople in Cyprus
Canadian expatriate sportspeople in Israel
Canadian expatriate sportspeople in Germany
Canadian expatriate sportspeople in Sweden
Canadian expatriate sportspeople in Norway
Canadian sportspeople of Jamaican descent
Black Canadian women's soccer players
North Mississauga SC (women) players
Ottawa Fury (women) players
USL W-League (1995–2015) players